Khonin is a Russian masculine surname, its feminine counterpart is Khonina. Notable people with the surname include:

Polina Khonina (born 1998), Russian rhythmic gymnast

Russian-language surnames